Ibrahim Metwaly Hegazy is an Egyptian lawyer and human rights activist and a member of the Egyptian Commission for Rights and Freedoms. In September 2017, Metwaly was detained by the Egyptian security services. He had been investigating the death in Egypt of the Italian student Giulio Regeni. On 10 September 2017, Metwaly was thrown into Tora Prison.

His detention was criticised by the governments of the UK, Canada, Germany, Italy, and the Netherlands.

See also
List of solved missing person cases

References

2010s missing person cases
Egyptian human rights activists
21st-century Egyptian lawyers
Formerly missing people
Living people
Missing person cases in Egypt
Year of birth missing (living people)